The Onze-Lieve-Vrouwetoren ('The Tower of Our Lady') is a church tower in Amersfoort. It is one of the most eye-catching monuments in town and the third highest church tower in the Netherlands. The nickname of the tower is Lange Jan ('Long John'). The church that belonged to the tower was destroyed by a gunpowder explosion in the 18th century.

History 
The first chapel on site was constructed on this site in the 14th century. In the 15th century the chapel was replaced by new church with three aisles. When the tower was built is not exactly known. Construction started around 1444 and was finished around 1470. The official documents of the construction were destroyed by the Protestants in 1579 during the reformation and the ensuing iconoclasm. The church and tower were taken over by the Protestants and no longer belonged to the Catholics.

The church also has been used for other purposes than worshiping. It was used as a storage place for ammunition and as laboratory for the manufacturing of shells.

In 1986 some research was done into its history and in the current square one can see the original plan of the church. The spire of the church burned down in 1651 and again in 1804. The tower was restored in 1912–1932, in 1965–1970 and in 1993–1996.

Dutch grid reference system
The middle point of the Dutch grid reference system is situated in the tower. From origin the tower spin was the middle of the grid with x = 0 and y = 0. This grid system was set up in the period 1885-1904. The coördinates were also called Amersfoort coördinates. The Zero-point was moved in the period 1960-1978, it moved 155 km Westwards and 463 km Southwards (120 km Southeast of Paris, 1 km East of La Celle-Saint-Cyr). The coördinates of the middle point since then are X = 155 000, Y = 463 000. Advantage of this new Zero-point is that there are no negative coördinates anymore and the X values differ from the Y values so mistakes shall not occur anymore.

Consoles on the tower
There are twelve consoles on the tower. The new consoles are designed and made by Ton Mooy during the restoration of 1993-1996. They replaced the weathered consoles from around 1930. The new consoles are made from Volvic basaltlava instead of the previous used Tuff stone, for reasons of durability and weather resistance. The basalt lava also mimics the surrounding Bentheimer sandstone in colouring, which could not be used anymore due to health regulations, and is suited for finer carving than tuff stone.

Extra information about the persons depicted on the consoles:
 Hendrik van Vianden was the Bishop of Utrecht who granted Amersfoort city rights in 1259
 Margriete Gijsen found the miraculous Maria statue in the water of the canal near the Kamperpoort in 1444
 David of Burgundy was the Bishop of Utrecht when the Onze Lieve Vrouwetoren was built
 Leendert Nicasius was the city carpenter, who saved the Onze Lieve Vrouwetoren from destruction in 1651 after it was struck by lightning

See also
 List of tallest structures built before the 20th century

References

External links
 Kadaster
 Onze-Lieve-Vrouwetoren

Towers in Utrecht (province)
Rijksmonuments in Amersfoort